Imokilly GAA is a Gaelic football and Hurling division in the east of Cork, Ireland. The division includes towns such as Midleton, Cobh, and Youghal. It is one of eight divisions of Cork County Board. It organizes competitions for the clubs within the division, from Under 12 up to the adult level. The winners of these competitions compete against other divisional champions to determine which club is the county champion. In addition, the division selects football and hurling teams from the adult teams playing at junior level or county intermediate level, and these then compete for the Cork Senior Football Championship and Cork Senior Hurling Championship. The division is known best for its hurlers, and in recent times, players from here have dominated on the Cork GAA senior hurling team.

Clubs

 Aghada
 Ballinacurra
 Bride Rovers
 Carrignavar
 Carrigtwohill
 Castlelyons
 Castlemartyr
 Cobh
 Cloyne
 Dungourney
 Erin's Own
 Fr. O'Neills
 Glanmire
 Glenbower Rovers
 Glenville
 Killeagh
 Lisgoold
 Midleton
 Russell Rovers
 Sarsfield's
 St. Catherine's
 St. Ita's
 Watergrasshill
 Youghal

Hurling

Grades

Football

Grades

Achievements
 Cork Senior Hurling Championship Winners (5) 1997, 1998, 2017, 2018, 2019, Runners-Up 1949, 1968, 1996, 2001
 Cork Senior Football Championship Winners (2) 1984, 1986 Runners-Up 1987

Notable players
 Dónal Óg Cusack
 Declan Dalton
 John Fenton
 Séamus Harnedy
 Conor Lehane
 Pearse O'Neill
 Diarmuid O'Sullivan

Divisional Competitions
 East Cork Junior A Hurling Championship
 East Cork Junior A Football Championship

References

External sources
 Divisional website
 An Illustrated History of the GAA in East Cork 1924-2010 by Tom Morrison

Divisional boards of Cork GAA
Gaelic games clubs in County Cork
Gaelic football clubs in County Cork
Hurling clubs in County Cork